Jub Jub may refer to:

Jub-Jub a fictional iguana from The Simpsons
Jubjub bird, a creature mentioned in Lewis Carroll's poems
Jub Jub (musician), South African hip hop artist